= Borac Incel Swimming Club =

Swimming club in Banja Luka

- Abbreviation: Borac
- Formation: 1955
- Type: Swimming club
- Location: Banja Luka

Borac Incel Swimming Club, on Serbian "Plivacki klub Borac". Archived from the original on 2010-07-03. (Serbian Cyrillic: Пливачки клуб Бopaц) is a swimming club from Banja Luka, Republika Srpska. It was founded in 1955. The club participated in various tournaments.

== Results ==
Results achieved by the swimming club in the former Yugoslavia include:

- Gold, silver and bronze medals in the Junior category.
- Bronze medal in the Senior category.
- Two bronze medals in the Relays - Senior category.
- Three gold, two silver and three bronze medals in the Pioneers category.
